The National Library of Brazil is the depository of the bibliographic and documentary heritage of Brazil. It is located in Rio de Janeiro, the capital city of Brazil from 1822 to 1960, more specifically at Cinelândia square.

The largest library in Latin America and the seventh largest in the world, its collections include about 9 million items. It organized the first library science courses in Latin America and its staff has led the modernization of library services, including the development of online databases.

History

The history of the National Library began on 1 November 1755, when Lisbon suffered a violent earthquake. The Royal Library was considered one of the most important libraries in Europe at that time. This irreparable loss to the Portuguese was the impetus for moving many of its contents to Brazil.  The collection was brought in three stages, the first being in 1810 and two in 1811. The library of 60,000 books was accommodated initially in the upstairs rooms of the Third Order of Carmel Hospital (in accordance with the charter of July 27, 1810), located in the old back street of Carmel close to the Imperial Palace. The facilities, however, were considered inadequate and as well potentially jeopardizing the valuable collection. Therefore, on 29 October 1810, a date that was assigned to the official founding of the National Library, Prince Regent John (later King John VI of Portugal, Brazil and the Algarves) issued a decree which provided that a royal library should be established from the funds of the royal treasury.

Expansion

The works for the new building of the Library only took place in 1813, when the collection was transferred. While the process of setting up the books, which began in 1810, was taking place the consultation of the Library collection could already be carried out by scholars, by royal consent, and in 1814, after the collection of the collection was completed, the consultation was public.

Officially established, the library continued to have a significant expansion through purchases, donations, mainly, and "tips", that is, by the obligatory delivery of a copy of all printed material in the typographic offices of Portugal (By decree of 12 September 1805) and in the Royal Printing, installed in Rio de Janeiro. This legislation on tips was improved over the years and culminated in Decree No. 1,825 of 20 December 1907, commonly called the Legal Deposit Decree, still in force.

Transfer of sovereignty
After the death of Queen Maria I in March 1816, the reign of King John VI began, and it remained in Brazil until 1821, when political circumstances made him return to Lisbon with the Royal Family, except for his eldest son Prince Pedro de Alcântara of Braganza (future Emperor of Brazil), who came to proclaim the independence of Brazil in 1822. Here also remained the Royal Library. At that time it had grown a lot and, after Independence, in 1822, became property of the Empire of Brazil, because its purchase is included in the Additional Convention to the Treaty of Friendship and Alliance signed between Brazil and Portugal on 29 August 1825. For the goods left in Brazil the Royal Family was indemnified in two million pounds sterling, of that value, eight hundred contos de reis were destined to the payment of the Royal Library, which was then called the Imperial and Public Library of the Court.

Building

In 1858, the Library was transferred to the Passeio street, number 60, in Lapa square, and installed in the building that had the purpose to better shelter its collection. As its collection continued to grow with donations, acquisitions and through legal contributions, purchase of rare art collections at auctions and in bookstores around the world, a new building was needed that best suited its needs.

The constant and permanent growth of the collection of the library was fundamental for the realization of a project of construction of a seat that would attend all the needs of the library, adequately accommodating its collections. Based on this, his current building was designed, which had its cornerstone launched on 15 August 1905, during the government of Rodrigues Alves. The inauguration took place on 29 October 1910, during the Nilo Peçanha government and in the first centenary of the Library.

The building of the National Library, whose project is signed by the military engineer Sousa Aguiar, has an eclectic style, in which neoclassical and art nouveau elements are mixed, and contains ornaments by artists such as Eliseu Visconti, Henrique and Rodolfo Bernardelli, Modesto Brocos and Rodolfo Amoedo. Eliseu Visconti, still in 1903, had already designed the ex-libris and the emblem of the National Library.

The library building is located at Rio Branco Avenue, number 219, Cinelândia Square, in the center of Rio de Janeiro, composing with the National Museum of Fine Arts and the Municipal Theater an architectural and cultural ensemble of great value.

Catalog
In 1911, Manoel Cicero Peregrino da Silva started a national union catalog for all Brazilian libraries. He set up the first library science course in South America. Many librarians went on to study in European and North American universities.

Legal deposit
In 1907, presidential Decree no. 1825 established the duty of all publishers to send one copy of each publication to then-called Bibliotheca Nacional. In 2004, this decree was revoked by congressional Law no. 10,994, still in force, upholding the same mandate but updating its provisions.

Article 1st of Law no. 10,994 specifies that the legal deposit's aim is "to ensure the registration and custody of national intellectual production, to allow for the control, development and spreading of current Brazilian bibliography, and to defend and preserve national language and culture."

Significant collections
Among the significant collections of the National Library of Brazil is the Teresa Cristina Maria photograph collection, which includes 21,742 photographs dating from the nineteenth century. These photographs were left to the Library by Emperor Pedro II in 1891. This collection has been inscribed on UNESCO's Memory of the World Programme Register in 2003 in recognition of its world significance and outstanding universal value. It features images related to Brazil's history and people from the 19th century, including photographs by Moritz Lamberg. There are also photographs from Africa, North America, and Europe.

Gallery

List of Former Directors
(incomplete list)
 Frei Camilo de Monserrate (29 April 1853 to 19 November 1870) 
 Benjamin Franklin Ramiz Galvão 
 João Saldanha da Gama
 F. L. Bitencourt Sampaio
 Francisco Mendes da Rocha
 Raul Pompeia
 José Alexandre Teixeira de Melo  (1895-1900)
 Manuel Cícero Peregrino da Silva  (1900-1924)
 Mario Behring (interim, 1923)
 Aurélio Lopes de Souza
 Basílio de Magalhães
 Rodolfo Garcia  (1932-1945)
 Rubens Borba de Moraes  (1945-1947)
 Josué Montello  (1947-1953)
 Eugênio Gomes  (1951-1956)
 Adonias Aguiar Filho 
 Jannice Monte-Mór
 Plínio Doyle 
 Celia Ribeiro Zaher
 Affonso Romano de Sant'Anna (1990-1996)
 Eduardo Portella (1996-2002)
 Pedro Corrêa do Lago (2003-2005)
 Muniz Sodré  (2009-2011) 
 Galeno Amorim (2011-2013)
 Renato Lessa (2013-2016)
 Helena Porto Severo da Costa (2016 - 2019) 
 Rafael Nogueira (2019-2022)
 Luiz Carlos Ramiro Junior (2022-present)

See also 
 List of libraries in Brazil
 Legal deposit
 National library
 Minuscule 2437
 Brazilian National Archives
 Asociación de Estados Iberoamericanos para el Desarrollo de las Bibliotecas Nacionales de Iberoamérica

References

External links

Official site 
Encarta (Archived 2009-11-01)

ISBN agencies
Government of Brazil
Brazil
Libraries in Rio de Janeiro (city)
World Digital Library partners
Deposit libraries
Libraries established in 1810
1810 establishments in Brazil